The Nagina Masjid is a masjid in Agra Fort built by Shah Jahan. It is also known as the Gem Mosque or the Jewel Mosque (See  Negin).

Architecture
Nagina Masjid is an architectural beauty in Agra Fort. It is located nearby another eye catching Masjid known as Moti Masjid. This mosque is constructed with pure white attractive marble and encloses the prayer chamber exquisitely designed.

The Nagina Masjid bears a very simple architecture and a descent decoration. The mosque is separated into three bays by simple pillars underneath the keen arches above. The arch in the center is bigger and has nine cusps, once on either face has seven cusps only. The mosque is 10.21 meter broad and 7.39 meter deep, facing a lined patio. There is a balcony presenting the panoramic views of the road that runs towards the Hathi Pol lies on the northern side of the Masjid.

This beautiful structure was built for the ladies of the Royal family. This private mosque has special features of three majestic domes and wonderful arches. A luxurious bazaar, known as Mina Bazar, was functioning down the road from where royal ladies could purchase items standing in the balcony of Nagina Masjid.

See also
Mina Masjid
Nagina Mosque

External links
http://www.tsiindia.com/north-india/nagina-masjid-agra.html

Agra Fort
Mosques in Agra
Mughal mosques